Dog & Butterfly is the fourth studio album by American rock band Heart, released on October 7, 1978, by Portrait Records, following a legal dispute with Mushroom Records over the release of the band's second studio album, Magazine, in April 1978. Dog & Butterfly peaked at number 17 on the US Billboard 200 and has been certified double platinum by the Recording Industry Association of America (RIAA). The album spawned the singles "Straight On" and "Dog & Butterfly".

As Heart themselves noted on the album's release, side one was the Dog side, and was the more "rocking" compared to the Butterfly side two, which consisted mostly of ballads, with the exception of the closer "Mistral Wind".

Though the first song, "Cook with Fire", sounds like a live recording, the liner notes to the 2004 CD reissue state that it was actually recorded at Sea-West Studios along with the rest of the album. Audience sounds from a live performance were overdubbed on the studio recording.

On June 29, 2004, the album was reissued by Epic Records and Legacy Recordings in a remastered edition, containing three bonus tracks. One of the songs, "Feels", was later reworked and became "Johnny Moon", included on the band's seventh studio album, Passionworks (1983).

Track listing

Personnel
Credits adapted from the liner notes of Dog & Butterfly.

Heart
 Ann Wilson – lead vocals ; chimes ; piano ; background vocals 
 Nancy Wilson – blues harp ; acoustic guitar ; background vocals ; "Hijinx" guitar, "Who's Who" vocals ; acoustic guitar (6- and 12-string) ; lead vocals 
 Roger Fisher – electric guitar ; lead guitar ; Zohn 
 Howard Leese – electric guitar ; mridangam African conga ; background vocals ; electric piano ; "Who's Who" vocals ; piano ; Avatar ; orchestral arrangement, conducting ; acoustic piano, Moog 
 Steve Fossen – bass ; dholak Indian drum 
 Michael Derosier – drums ; chimes

Additional musicians
 Dick Adams – introduction 
 Sue Ennis – fun machine

Technical
 Mike Flicker – production, engineering
 Heart – production
 Michael Fisher – production
 Rick Keefer – engineering
 T.J. Landon – engineering assistance
 Terry Gottlieb – engineering assistance
 Armin Steiner – strings engineering
 John Golden – mastering at Kendun Recorders (Burbank, California)

Artwork
 Mike Doud – art direction, design
 Fu-Tung Cheng – illustration
 Philip Chiang – design
 Gary Heery – photography

Charts

Weekly charts

Year-end charts

Certifications

Notes

References

1978 albums
Albums produced by Mike Flicker
Heart (band) albums
Portrait Records albums
Albums recorded at Capitol Studios